The Game That Kills is a 1937 American mystery sport film directed by D. Ross Lederman and starring Charles Quigley and Rita Hayworth.

Plot
After his brother is killed on the ice during a hockey game, Alex Ferguson, convinced it was no accident, goes undercover as a new player to discover the truth.

Alex falls for Betty Holland, the coach's daughter. He ultimately learns that team owner Maxwell is in cahoots with gamblers, as are a couple of his players, and coach Joe Holland is in debt to them. Betty takes a job at a newspaper and endeavors to clear her dad's name while Alex survives a dangerous game, followed by a confrontation with the crooks.

Cast
 Charles Quigley as Alex Ferguson
 Rita Hayworth as Betty Holland
 John Gallaudet as Sam Erskine
 J. Farrell MacDonald as Joe Holland
 Arthur Loft as Rudy Maxwell
 John Tyrrell as Eddie
 Paul Fix as Dick Adams
 Max Hoffman Jr. as Bill Drake
 Dick Wessel as 'Leapfrog' Soule

References

External links
 

1937 films
1930s mystery films
1930s sports films
American mystery films
American ice hockey films
Films directed by D. Ross Lederman
1930s English-language films
American black-and-white films
Columbia Pictures films
1930s American films